Stephanus Christiaan Dippenaar (born 3 January 1988) is a South African rugby union footballer. He currently represents the South Africa national sevens team in the IRB Sevens World Series. Between 2008 and 2011 he played for the Bulls in Super Rugby and the Blue Bulls in the Currie Cup and Vodacom Cup.

Dippenaar represented South Africa's under-19 team at the 2007 Under 19 Rugby World Championship in Ireland. In 2008, he played for South Africa's under-20 team at the Junior World Championship in Wales. He made his international sevens debut for the South African sevens team in 2012 at the Wellington Sevens.

In 2013, he was included in the squad for the 2013 Rugby World Cup Sevens. Dippenaar was injured at the 2015 Hong Kong Sevens and was replaced by Ruhan Nel. He had just recovered from an injury he sustained at the Gold Coast Sevens at the beginning of the series.

On 17 October 2017, Dippenaar announced his retirement from rugby on Twitter.

References

External links
 
 

1988 births
Living people
Blue Bulls players
Bulls (rugby union) players
Competitors at the 2013 World Games
Rugby union centres
Rugby union players from Moorreesburg
South Africa international rugby sevens players
South Africa Under-20 international rugby union players
South African rugby union players
White South African people
World Games gold medalists